SS Soter Ortynsky was a Liberty ship built in the United States during World War II. She was named after Soter Ortynsky, the first Bishop of all Greek Catholics in the United States.

Construction 
Soter Ortynsky was laid down on 25 October 1944, under a Maritime Commission (MARCOM) contract, MC hull 2331, by J.A. Jones Construction, Panama City, Florida; and launched on 27 November 1944.

History
She was allocated to Wessel Duval & Company, 8 December 1944. On 7 November 1945, she was placed in the James River Reserve Fleet, in Lee Hall, Virginia. She had been laid up because of the need for $56,500 in repairs.

She was sold for scrapping, 21 December 1959, to Bethlehem Steel, for $75,421. She was withdrawn from the fleet, 7 January 1960.

References

Bibliography 

 
 
 
 

 

Liberty ships
Ships built in Panama City, Florida
1944 ships
James River Reserve Fleet